The Doors: Box Set is a box set compilation of recordings by American rock band the Doors, released on October 28, 1997. The four-disc set includes previously rare and unreleased studio, live and demo recordings, as well as a disc of the band's personal favorite tracks culled from their official discography.

Critical reception

In a retrospective review for AllMusic, Bruce Eder gave the album a rating of four and a half out of five stars. He noted:

Track listing
Details are taken from the original 1997 Elektra Records box set liner notes and may differ from other sources.
All songs written by the Doors (Jim Morrison, Robby Krieger, Ray Manzarek, and John Densmore), except where noted.

Tracks 1–5 selected by Krieger, 6–10 by Manzarek, 11–15 by Densmore

Certifications

References

1997 compilation albums
Albums produced by Bruce Botnick
Elektra Records compilation albums
The Doors compilation albums